The Federation Trail is a  shared use path for cyclists and pedestrians, which mainly follows the heritage-listed Main Outfall Sewer through the western suburbs of Melbourne, Victoria, Australia. There are three bridges spanning across major arterial roads, as well as button-activated traffic light crossings at most other major road-trail intersections.

For safety reasons, cyclists are no longer allowed to ride on the metropolitan section of the Princes Freeway (or any other urban freeway). The Federation Trail therefore is the preferred alternative route. West of Werribee, where the Federation Trail ends, Geelong-bound cyclists may use the freeway shoulders, as it is then considered a rural freeway.

The trail was officially opened on 22 October 2006.

In 2010 work started on extending the trail from Millers Road to Williamstown Rd. Completion of stage 1 of the VicRoads Truck Action Plan should see the trail finally connected from Williamstown Road to the Hobsons Bay Coastal Trail on Hyde Street. In March 2011, work on the extension stopped completely, due to a change of government and troubles with funding and design of the bridge to Fogarty Avenue. Thirteen hundred metres of concrete path had been built which lay idle until November 2014, when the bridge was completed.

In November 2014, VicRoads announced that the trail has been extended from Millers Road to Fogarty Avenue in Yarraville with the completion of the  Brooklyn Bridge over the Brooklyn freight line. The next two stages include extending the trail to Williamstown Road and Hyde Street.

An interactive map of the trail as well as others in the Melbourne area is available from the 'External Links' section in this article.

Route

Much of the trail follows the historic reservation of the heritage listed Main Outfall Sewer which was built in the 1890s.  At that time the sewer was the largest civil engineering project ever undertaken in Victoria. The associated pumping station can be found in the Scienceworks Museum complex. In recent years, the Greening the Pipeline initiative is exploring opportunities to transform the Main Outfall Sewer into a parkland to connect communities, and provide a unique space to meet, play and relax. This project is a partnership between Melbourne Water, Wyndham City Council, VicRoads and City West Water. The project is supported by Greening the West.

Snakes may be seen in the Skeleton Creek and Werribee River areas during hot weather. Walkers are advised to stay on the path to enjoy the scenery.

Landmarks include the Kororoit Creek, a tunnel under the Western Ring Road freeway, RAAF Williams (Laverton base), Lawrie Emmins Reserve, Skeleton Creek, Werribee Mercy Hospital, Victoria University (Werribee campus), Werribee Park, Werribee Open Range Zoo, and the Werribee River.

Connections

The western terminus of the trail is with its junction with the Werribee River Trail at Werribee where there is access to the Princes Freeway at this point. Near Hoppers Crossing it intersects with the upper section of the Skeleton Creek Trail. The eastern terminus of the trail is at Millers Road in Brooklyn, near Altona North.

The Hobsons Bay Coastal Trail can be accessed by relatively quiet back streets: At the east end of the trail, cross Fogarty Avenue to the shared path that accesses Mill Avenue and Benbow Street. Go north on Wembley Avenue to Freame Street. Take Drew Street to Austin Crescent East via the Stony Creek footbridge and then Anderson Street and Schild Street to the Bay Trail at Hyde Street. Be cautious on Anderson Street between Williamstown Road and Schild Street.

Another option of riding into the Melbourne City Centre is to leave the Federation Trail at Geelong Road and ride along the service lanes (and a pedestrian subway under the railway) to connect with one of the numerous paths or streets which go east-west through the Footscray area.

See also

Bike paths in Melbourne

References

External links
An interactive map of the trail as well as others in the Melbourne area is available here: Walking and Cycling in Melbourne

 VicRoads - Federation Trail shared path
Bikely - Federation Trail map
Greening the Pipeline

Bike paths in Melbourne